Sido is a commune in the Bougouni Cercle of southern Mali's Sikasso Region. In 1998, it had a population of 13,877.

References

Communes of Sikasso Region